Bayamón may refer to:

Places
Bayamón, Puerto Rico, a municipality
Bayamón, Cidra, Puerto Rico, a barrio
Bayamón barrio-pueblo, a barrio